The 2022 Asian Men's U20 Volleyball Championship was the 21st edition of the Asian Men's U20 Volleyball Championship, a biennial international volleyball tournament organised by the Asian Volleyball Confederation (AVC) with Bahrain Volleyball Association (BVA). The tournament was held in Riffa, Bahrain from 22 to 29 August.

This tournament served as the qualification tournament for the FIVB Volleyball Men's U21 World Championship. The top two teams of the tournament qualified for the 2023 FIVB Volleyball Men's U21 World Championship as the AVC representatives.

Players must be born on or after January 1, 2003. Players who had played twice in the FIVB Junior (U20 or U21) Championships cannot play in AVC Junior Championship as it is a qualification event for the following year of FIVB Junior event.

Qualification
The 18 AVC member associations submitted their U20 men's national team to the 2022 Asian U20 Championship. But, Kazakhstan later withdrew. The 17 AVC member associations were from 5 zonal associations, including, Central Asia (4 teams), East Asia (5 teams), Oceania (1 teams), Southeast Asia (1 teams) and West Asia (6 teams).

Qualified teams
The following teams qualified for the tournament.

Pools composition

* Kazakhstan withdrew from the competition.

Format
Preliminary round: All teams are divided into 6 pools. Robin round to classify ranking. Top 2 teams advance to Classification round of 1st - 12th places. The bottom teams to enter to Classification round of 13th - 18th.

Classification & Final round: Knockout stage. Drawing of lots will be taken to determine the best team of each group's opponent. Winner to advance to quarterfinals. The best team of Pool A and Pool B and their opponents will enter to quarterfinal directly. Teams have faced each other in Preliminary round will not play again in Classification round. The losing teams at knockout stage are subjectd to play classification match to determine final ranking.

The drawing of lots for second is schedueled to take place on Wednesday 24th August 2022  at 9pm local time.

Venues

Pool standing procedure
 Number of victories
 Match points
 Sets quotient
 Points quotient
 If the tie continues as per the point quotient between two teams, the priority will be given to the team which won the last match between them. When the tie in points ratio is between three or more teams, a new classification of these teams in the terms of points 1, 2 and 3 will be made taking into consideration only the matches in which they were opposed to each other.

Match won 3–0 or 3–1: 3 match points for the winner, 0 match points for the loser.
Match won 3–2: 2 match points for the winner, 1 match point for the loser.
Match forfeited: 0 point (25-0;25-0;25-0)

Preliminary round
All times are Arabia Standard Time (UTC+3:00).

Pool A

|}

|}

Pool B

|}

|}

Pool C

|}

|}

Pool D

|}

|}

Pool E

|}

|}

Pool F

|}

|}

Final round
All times are Arabia Standard Time (UTC+3:00).

13th–17th playoffs
|}

1st–12th playoffs
|}

7th–12th playoffs
|}

Quarterfinals
|}

13th–16th semifinals
|}

15th place match
|}

13th place match
|}

11th place match
|}

7th–10th semifinals
|}

9th place match
|}

7th place match
|}

5th place match
|}

Semifinals
|}

3rd place match
|}

Final
|}

Final standing

Awards

Most Valuable Player

Best Setter

Best Outside Spikers

Best Middle Blockers

Best Opposite Spiker

Best Libero

See also
2022 Asian Women's U20 Volleyball Championship
2022 Asian Boys' U18 Volleyball Championship

References

External links
 Asian Volleyball Confederation – official website
 Team Roster

Asian Men's U20 Volleyball Championship
Asian U20 Championship
International volleyball competitions hosted by Bahrain
Asian Men's U20 Volleyball Championship
Asian Men's U20 Volleyball Championship
2022 in volleyball